Nandinho may refer to:

 Nandinho (footballer, born 1973), Portuguese football player
 Nandinho (footballer, born 1975), Portuguese football player
 Nandinho (footballer, born 1998), Angolan football player
 Nandinho (futsal player), Portuguese futsal player